John Government Higher Secondary School is a school in Viswema, Nagaland providing both High school and Higher secondary school education. The school is the third oldest school in Nagaland.

Overview 
John Government Higher Secondary School was established in 1945 and is located in Viswema, Kohima District of Nagaland. The school consists of grades from 6 to 12 and doesn't have an attached pre-primary section. The school library has over 800 books.

The Viswema Hall is currently under-construction at the site of the school.

Alumni 
 Vizol Angami
 Zale Neikha

See also 
 List of schools in Nagaland

References

External links 

Education in Nagaland
High schools and secondary schools in Nagaland
Kohima district
Educational institutions established in 1945
1945 establishments in India